David Falconer Wells (born May 11, 1939) is Distinguished Senior Research Professor at Gordon-Conwell Theological Seminary. He is the author of several books in which his evangelical theology engages with the modern world. He has taught at Trinity Evangelical Divinity School and has served as the Academic Dean at Gordon-Conwell Theological Seminary's Charlotte, North Carolina campus.

Wells received his B.D. from the University of London; Th.M. from Trinity Evangelical Divinity School; Ph.D. from Manchester University (England); and was a post-doctoral Research Fellow at Yale Divinity School. Wells is a Council member of the Alliance of Confessing Evangelicals. He also serves on the board of the Rafiki Foundation and as a member for the Lausanne Committee for World Evangelization. The Cambridge Declaration came about in 1996 as a result of his book No Place for Truth, or Whatever Happened to Evangelical Theology?

Books
He has authored, co-authored, or edited numerous publications including:

, republished

References

1939 births
American Congregationalists
American Calvinist and Reformed theologians
Living people
Trinity Evangelical Divinity School alumni
20th-century Calvinist and Reformed theologians
21st-century Calvinist and Reformed theologians